Cilincing is a historic neighborhood of the coast of Jakarta, Indonesia. It is sandwiched between the Port of Tanjung Priok to the west and River Titram to the east. Cilincing has been for some decades one of the districts of North Jakarta which in turn encompasses as far as Marunda and some non-coastal hinterland.

The name Cilincing is likely derived from the name of the river Ci Lincing, the local river that flows to its northern mouth. Ci is a Sundanese word for "river". Cilincing is the name for the plant carambola.

Government 
As a district (Indonesian: kecamatan), it is much larger than the historic guise, and includes the coastal neighborhood of Marunda and the more inland neighborhood of Tugu. Cilincing district is the northeasternmost district of Jakarta. Much of it is allotted for agriculture and industry. Cakung Drain, part of Jakarta's flood canal, flows through the district to Jakarta Bay.

Cilincing District is divided into seven Administrative Villages (kelurahan):

History

Early development 
During the early colonial period, Cilincing (older spelling Tji Lintjing) was a name of a coastal area located around 7 km east of the cape of Priok (Malay Tanjong Priok). The land of Cilincing were dotted with fish ponds, similar with Ancol but less marshy, allowing early settlements to grow. The coast of Cilincing contained a shell-rich beach and among few places in Java which contains the species of cemara laut ("sea pine").

In late 18th-century, four manor houses (landhuizen) were established by the Dutch, from west to east: Tanjong Priok house belonging to De heer van Riemsdyk, Pajonkoran house (also Jonkoraan) to Richold ter Schegget, Bangliauw house (variously written as Bangleu or Bank Loeau) to Paul Bergman, and the easternmost and the most imposing of all Cilincing mansion belonging to Johannes Christoffel Schultz. These mansions were connected to the walled city of Batavia through the Vaart canal (possibly a pre-Dutch canal) and then to Ancol canal, which was then connected to the outer canal of the walled city of Batavia.

The Cilincing mansion, located roughly in what is now the kecamatan office of Cilincing district, was the administration center of the early settlements in Cilincing. A Tuesday market was established to the north of Cilincing mansion. The mansion was strategically located, being the point where the traffic from the Vaart canal connects with the road to the plantation area to the south. One of the settlement of the southern plantation is the Portuguese Tugu settlement, among the oldest settlement in Jakarta.

Seaside resorts of Cilincing (19th-century – 1970s) 

Beginning in the late 19th-century, the seaside area of Cilincing started to become a popular seaside recreation area. Dutch people and natives alike flocked to the seaside of Cilincing to enjoy the pristine water or to have a picnic. One popular resort was the Palm Beach Cilincing which was supported with recreational facilities such as eating places and bathing areas.

The popularity of Cilincing as a seaside resort continued to the 20th-century. Another popular seaside resort of Cilincing in the 1950s was the Sindang Laut on the western edge of Cilincing near the Port of Tanjung Priok. Sindang Laut was equipped with restaurant, playground, and berths for small boats. Sindang Laut has been demolished, the area converted into industrial port area, and is now Bogasari Flour Mills.

Industrial and slum area (post 1980s) 
Cilincing and its surrounding area continued its popularity as seaside resort until the 1970s. The beginning of the 1980s saw the decline of Cilincing's popularity, mainly caused by the expansion of the Port of Tanjung Priok plus increasing pollution along the north coast of Java. The success of the reclamation of the seaside part of Ancol into Ancol Dreamland resort in 1962 prompted President Suharto to start another reclamation project, the Pantai Mutiara and the Pantai Indah Kapuk project; the land fill for Pantai Indah Kapuk project was dredged from Palm Beach Cilincing. With the shift of Jakarta's seaside resort toward Ancol, Pantai Indah Kapuk, and Pantai Mutiara, Cilincing as seaside resort effectively ended.

By the late 1990s, Cilincing had become industrialized and had become a garbage-strewn slum. What used to be the attractive Palm Beach Cilincing is now an unattractive ship scrapyard, surrounded with slum. The area remain underdeveloped to present time.

Marunda Dam 
Based on DKI Jakarta Governor Rule Number 77 Year 2009, 56 hectares of Marunda Dam will be built plus 12 hectares of Integrated Waste Management, 5.8 hectares of Asphalt Mixing Plant, 43.3 hectares of Public Green Designation and 29.9 hectares of Facilities and Infrastructure for Supporting Operational Functions of the East Flood Canal (Kanal Banjir Timur) or totally 147 hectares project. Marunda Dam will be initially built in 2012.

List of important places 
Below are list of important places in the district of Cilincing.
Al Alam Mosque, also known as Si Pitung Mosque, a wooden mosque built in the early 18th century.
Aulia Marunda Mosque, built in the 17th century.
The grave of Captain Tete Jonker
Kalibaru Port
Kampung Marunda
Langgar Tinggi or Rumah Si Pitung (Si Pitung Residence), a red wooden stilt house built in the 20th century. This bugis-style house is believed by locals as the house where Si Pitung, a Betawi legendary hero, commit burglary. A new bridge accommodating cars is being built for ease directly visit Si Pitung Residence.
Rawa Malang City Forest, a 5 hectares area in Semper Timur Administrative Village which is occupied mostly by Trembesi trees.
Marunda Port

See also 
Batavia, Dutch East Indies

References

Cited works 

Districts of Jakarta
North Jakarta